Mayville is an unincorporated community located within Wilmington Township, Lawrence County, Pennsylvania, United States.

References

Unincorporated communities in Lawrence County, Pennsylvania
Unincorporated communities in Pennsylvania